In decisions in the cases C-146/13 and C-147/13 issued in May 2015, the European Court of Justice (ECJ) rejected two challenges by Spain against the legality of both unitary patent regulations. The decisions are significant because these legal challenges were regarded as "the last serious obstacle to the Unitary Patent Package being implemented", "provided the necessary number of ratifications of the Unified Patent Court Agreement occur (13 including UK, France and Germany)."

In case C-146/13, Spain challenged Regulation (EU) No 1257/2012 implementing enhanced cooperation in the area of the creation of unitary patent protection, and in case C-147/13, Regulation No 1260/2012 of 17 December 2012, implementing enhanced cooperation in the area of the creation of unitary patent protection with regard to the applicable translation arrangements, was challenged.

References

Further reading

External links
C-146/13: Decision , and Advice of the Advocate-General 
C-147/13: Decision , and Advice of the Advocate-General 
"The Court dismisses both of Spain’s actions against the regulations implementing enhanced cooperation in the area of the creation of unitary patent protection", Court of Justice of the European Union, Press Release No 49/15, Luxembourg, 5 May 2015

Court of Justice of the European Union case law
Patent law of the European Union